Martin Larsson may refer to:
Martin M. Larsson, Danish songwriter and producer
Martin Larsson (footballer), Swedish former footballer who played as a defender
Martin Larsson (guitarist) (born 1973), heavy metal musician
Martin Larsson (skier) (born 1979), cross-country skier
Martin Q Larsson (born 1968), Swedish composer and musician
Martin Larsson, pro videogamer known as Rekkles

See also
 Martin A. Larson (1897–1994), American populist religious freethinker and Christian historian